An osmophile is a microorganism adapted to environments with high osmotic pressures, such as high sugar concentrations. Osmophiles are similar to halophiles (salt-loving organisms) in that a critical aspect of both types of environment is their low water activity, aW. High sugar concentrations represent a growth-limiting factor for many microorganisms, yet osmophiles protect themselves against this high osmotic pressure by the synthesis of osmoprotectants such as alcohols and amino acids. Many osmophilic microorganisms are yeasts; some bacteria are also osmophilic.

Osmophilic yeasts are important because they cause spoilage in the sugar and sweet goods industry,  with products such as fruit juices, fruit juice concentrates, liquid sugars (such as golden syrup), honey and in some cases marzipan. Among the most osmophilic are:

References